Elections to Ballymoney Borough Council were held on 5 May 2011 on the same day as the other Northern Irish local government elections. The election used three district electoral areas to elect a total of 16 councillors.

Election results

Note: "Votes" are the first preference votes.

Districts summary

|- class="unsortable" align="centre"
!rowspan=2 align="left"|Ward
! % 
!Cllrs
! % 
!Cllrs
! %
!Cllrs
! %
!Cllrs
! % 
!Cllrs
! % 
!Cllrs
!rowspan=2|TotalCllrs
|- class="unsortable" align="center"
!colspan=2 bgcolor="" | DUP
!colspan=2 bgcolor="" | Sinn Féin
!colspan=2 bgcolor="" | UUP
!colspan=2 bgcolor="" | SDLP
!colspan=2 bgcolor="" | TUV
!colspan=2 bgcolor="white"| Others
|-
|align="left"|Ballymoney Town
|bgcolor="#D46A4C"|56.5
|bgcolor="#D46A4C"|3
|0.0
|0
|15.0
|1
|9.9
|0
|7.4
|0
|11.2
|1
|5
|-
|align="left"|Bann Valley
|bgcolor="#D46A4C"|42.3
|bgcolor="#D46A4C"|3
|34.0
|2
|7.1
|0
|7.6
|0
|9.0
|1
|0.0
|0
|6
|-
|align="left"|Bushvale
|bgcolor="#D46A4C"|39.5
|bgcolor="#D46A4C"|2
|19.7
|1
|21.9
|1
|13.1
|1
|5.8
|0
|0.0
|0
|5
|-'
|-
|- class="unsortable" class="sortbottom" style="background:#C9C9C9"
|align="left"| Total
|45.3
|8
|20.5
|3
|13.7
|2
|9.9
|1
|7.6
|1
|3.0
|1
|16
|-
|}

Districts results

Ballymoney Town

2005: 3 x DUP, 2 x UUP
2011: 3 x DUP, 1 x UUP, 1 x Independent
2005-2011 Change: Independent gain from UUP

Bann Valley

2005: 3 x DUP, 2 x Sinn Féin, 1 x SDLP
2011: 3 x DUP, 2 x Sinn Féin, 1 x TUV
2005-2011 Change: TUV gain from SDLP

Bushvale

2005: 2 x DUP, 1 x Sinn Féin, 1 x SDLP, 1 x Independent
2011: 2 x DUP, 1 x UUP, 1 x Sinn Féin, 1 x SDLP
2005-2011 Change: Independent joins UUP

References

Ballymoney Borough Council elections
Ballymoney